Dashi-Dorzho Itigilov (Etigelei Dashadorjo; 1852–1927) was a Buryat Buddhist lama of the Tibetan Buddhist tradition.

Born in the countryside of Buryatia, Itigilov's parents left him at an early age, forcing him to pursue sheep-herding to make ends meet. When he was 15, Itigilov joined the Anninsky Monastery, where he learned to read Tibetan and Sanskrit, enabling him to read Buddhist texts and serve in the Buddhist community. After becoming the religious leader of Russian Buddhists, Itigilov raised money to provide food, clothing, and medical care to World War I soldiers, among other philanthropic acts. In 1927, he died while in a Lotus position. After he was buried in a pine box, Itigilov was exhumed in 1957, showing an intact body. After a change of clothes, a reburial, and a second exhumation in 1973, it was decided in 2002 that Itigilov would remain above ground permanently.

See also 
Buddhist mummies

References 

1852 births
1927 deaths
Buryat people
Buddhism in Buryatia
Mummies
Lamas
Tibetan Buddhists from the Russian Empire
Tibetan Buddhists from the Soviet Union
Buddhist monks from the Russian Empire